"The Age of Love" is a song by German group Scooter. It was released in August 1997 as the second and final single from their fourth album, Age of Love (1997). It is based on a sample of the theme to the 1991 film Terminator 2: Judgment Day.

Track listings
 Original version
"The Age of Love" – 3:50
"The Age of Love" (Club Mix) – 6:07
"Turn Up That Blaster" – 5:20

 Remixes
"The Age of Love" (S/M in Motion Remix) – 6:24
"The Age of Love" (DJ Errik's Destruction Mix) – 6:35
"The Age of Love" (Triple S Funky Remix) – 5:13
"The Age of Love" (Mad Man in Love Remix) – 8:38
"The Age of Love" (Original Video Edit) – 3:50

Charts

References

1997 singles
Scooter (band) songs
Songs written by H.P. Baxxter
Songs written by Rick J. Jordan
Songs written by Jens Thele
1997 songs
Number-one singles in Finland